Deborah is a major character in the Book of Judges.

Deborah may also refer to:

Given name
 Deborah (given name) or Devorah, a female given name
 Deborah (Genesis), the nurse of Rebecca, a minor character in the Book of Genesis

Music
 Deborah (album), a 1996 album by American singer Debbie Gibson
 Deborah (Handel), a 1733 oratorio by German composer George Frideric Handel
 "Deborah", a 1978 song by Welsh singer Dave Edmunds

Places
 Deborah Heart and Lung Center, a specialty hospital in New Jersey, United States
 Mount Deborah, a mountain in Alaska, United States
 Dvora, Israel, a small community

Vehicles
 Ferrari SP38 Deborah, a 2018 Italian one-off sports car
 Deborah, a British Mark IV tank

Other uses
 Deborah number, used in rheology to characterize how "fluid" a material is
 Deborah (TV series), a 1967 Mexican telenovela

See also
 Deb (disambiguation)
 Debs (disambiguation)
 Debra (disambiguation)
 Debbie (disambiguation)